the CEV Snow Volleyball European Tour  is a unisex sport competition for European national teams in the sport of snow volleyball. The competition is held annually by the CEV (the European volleyball federation). It was first organized in 2016.

Events

References

Snow volleyball
Volleyball competitions in Europe
2016 establishments in Europe
February sporting events
March sporting events
Recurring sporting events established in 2016